The Max Müller Library was a library in Japan named after Max Müller, and held books mainly focused on languages and religion. It was badly damaged during an earthquake and the following fires in September 1923.

See also 
 Destruction of libraries

References 

Libraries in Japan